(Ilse) Lisl Novak Gaal (born January 17, 1924) is an Austrian-born American mathematician known for her contributions to set theory and Galois theory. She was the first woman to hold a tenure-track position in mathematics at Cornell University, and is an associate professor emeritus at the University of Minnesota.

Contributions
Gaal's dissertation work was in the foundations of mathematics. It proved that two different systems for set theory that had previously been proposed as foundational were equiconsistent: either both are valid or both lead to contradictions. These two systems were Zermelo set theory and Von Neumann set theory. They differed from each other in that von Neumann had added to Zermelo's theory a notion of classes, collections of mathematical objects that are defined by some property but do not necessarily form a set. (Often, intuitively, proper classes are "too big" to form sets; for instance, the collection of all sets cannot itself be a set, by Russell's paradox, but it can be a class.) Gaal's work showed that introducing this extra notion of a class is a safe step, one that does not introduce any new inconsistencies into the system.

Gaal is also the author of two books:
Classical Galois Theory with Examples (Markham Publishing, 1971; third ed., Chelsea Publishing, 1979; reprinted 1998)
A Mathematical Gallery (American Mathematical Society, 2017)

Early life and education
Gaal was born in Vienna on January 17, 1924, the daughter of a gynecologist and the sister of Gertrude M. Novak, who became a physician in Chicago. She and her two sisters escaped Nazi Germany, and moved with their family to New York City.

After graduating from Hunter College with an A.B. in 1944, Gaal earned a doctorate in 1948 from Harvard University, through Radcliffe College. Her dissertation, On the Consistency of Goedel's Axioms for Class and Set Theory Relative to a Weaker Set of Axioms, was jointly supervised by Lynn Harold Loomis and Willard Van Orman Quine.

Later career
Gaal lived in Berkeley, California in 1950–1951. She and her husband, mathematician Steven Gaal, both moved to Cornell University, beginning as instructors in 1953 but then in 1954 being promoted to assistant professors. This step was the first time the Cornell mathematics department had offered a tenure-track position to a woman. She also became the first woman at Cornell to advise the doctorate of a mathematics student, Angelo Margaris.

The Gaals moved again in 1957, to the University of Minnesota, where Lisl Gaal is an associate professor emeritus.

In later life, Gaal became a lithographer, making prints that combined mathematical themes with Minnesota scenes.
Her book A Mathematical Gallery collects some of her mathematical illustrations.

References

1924 births
Living people
Austrian mathematicians
20th-century American mathematicians
21st-century American mathematicians
American women mathematicians
Set theorists
Hunter College alumni
Radcliffe College alumni
Cornell University faculty
University of Minnesota faculty
20th-century women mathematicians
21st-century women mathematicians
Austrian emigrants to the United States
20th-century American women
21st-century American women